Yentl is a soundtrack album to the film of the same name by American singer Barbra Streisand. It was released on November 8, 1983, by Columbia Records. The album was produced by Streisand and Alan and Marilyn Bergman, and arranged and conducted by Michel Legrand. The music is by Legrand and the lyrics by the Bergmans. The album peaked at No. 9 on the Billboard Top 200 LP chart was gold and platinum status on January 9, 1984, by the RIAA for shipping 500,000 and 1 million copies, respectively.

"The Way He Makes Me Feel" was released as the album's lead single reaching number 40 on the Billboard Hot 100 chart and spending two weeks at number one on the adult contemporary chart. "Papa, Can You Hear Me?" was released as a follow-up and became another Top 30 Adult Contemporary Hit. "No Matter What Happens" was released as the second single in the UK.

In 1991, Streisand released three demos from the album sessions on her retrospective box set: Just for the Record including the previously unreleased song "The Moon And I."

According to the liner notes of Just for the Record, the album also received a record certification in France, the Netherlands and Israel. Streisand told Digital Audio & Compact Disc Review magazine, that the album sold more than 3.5 million copies worldwide.

Track listing 
All music composed by Michel Legrand; all lyrics by Alan and Marilyn Bergman
 "Where Is It Written?" – 4:52
 "Papa, Can You Hear Me?" – 3:29
 "This Is One of Those Moments" – 4:07
 "No Wonder" – 2:30
 "The Way He Makes Me Feel" – 3:44
 "No Wonder" (Part Two) – 3:19
 "Tomorrow Night" – 4:43
 "Will Someone Ever Look at Me That Way?" – 3:03
 "No Matter What Happens" – 4:03
 "No Wonder" (Reprise) – 1:05
 "A Piece of Sky" – 4:19
 "The Way He Makes Me Feel" (Studio version) – 4:09
 "No Matter What Happens" (Studio version) – 3:18

Charts

Weekly charts

Year-end charts

Certifications and sales 

}
}
}
}
}
}

References 

1983 soundtrack albums
Barbra Streisand soundtracks
Albums produced by Phil Ramone
Columbia Records soundtracks
Musical film soundtracks
Scores that won the Best Original Score Academy Award